Williamsport is an unincorporated community in Maury County, Tennessee, United States. Its ZIP code is 38487.

Williamsport was platted in 1817, and named after Edward Williams, a pioneer settler.

Notes

Unincorporated communities in Maury County, Tennessee
Unincorporated communities in Tennessee